In telecommunication, a layered system is a system in which components are grouped, i.e., layered, in a hierarchical arrangement, such that lower layers provide functions and services that support the functions and services of higher layers. 

Systems of ever-increasing complexity and capability can be built by adding or changing the layers to improve overall system capability while using the components that are still in place.

Network topology
Holism